Edward Earle Ellis (March 18, 1926 – March 2, 2010) was an American biblical scholar. Ellis served as Research Professor of Theology Emeritus at Southwestern Baptist Theological Seminary in Fort Worth, Texas, joining the institution in 1985.

Early life
Ellis was born to Lindsey Thornton and Lois Belle McBride Ellis in Fort Lauderdale, Florida. Ellis served in the United States Army from 1944 to 1946. Following he completed a Bachelor of Science degree at the University of Virginia in 1950, with concentrations in law, economics, political science and history. Ellis studied at the University of Virginia School of Law and intended to enter into a career in law. However, he left legal studies in order to pursue biblical studies.

He studied at Faith Seminary in Wilmington, Delaware, but soon moved to the Wheaton Graduate School in Wheaton, Ill. From Wheaton he received MA and BA degrees by 1953. Two years later, he was awarded with a PhD degree from the University of Edinburgh.

Academic life
Ellis served in universities and seminaries throughout the United States, including the Southern Baptist Theological Seminary and Southwestern Seminary. He also founded the Institute for Biblical Research and the International Reference Library for Biblical Research. At Southwestern he served as Research Professor of Theology (1985–1998) and then as Research Professor of Theology Emeritus.

Prior to Southwestern Seminary Ellis taught at New Brunswick Theological Seminary (1977–85); Bethel Theological Seminary (1960–77); Southern Baptist Theological Seminary (1958–60); and Aurora College (1955–58).

In 1987, a Festschrift was published in his honor. Tradition and Interpretation in the New Testament: Essays in Honor of E. Earle Ellis for His 60th Birthday included contributions from C. K. Barrett, Richard N. Longenecker, I. Howard Marshall, C. F. D. Moule, F. F. Bruce, and Peder Borgen.

Selected works

Books

Chapters & Articles

References

American Christian theologians
American biblical scholars
Southwestern Baptist Theological Seminary alumni
1926 births
2010 deaths
Southwestern Baptist Theological Seminary faculty
New Testament scholars
Writers from Fort Lauderdale, Florida
Alumni of the University of Edinburgh
Bethel University (Minnesota) faculty
Wheaton College (Illinois) alumni
20th-century Christian biblical scholars
Baptist biblical scholars
20th-century Baptists